Tabitha Sayo Victoria Anne Suzuma is a British writer. She was born in 1975 and lives in London. She used to work as a primary school teacher and now divides her time between writing and tutoring. She is known for her novel 𝙁𝙤𝙧𝙗𝙞𝙙𝙙𝙚𝙣 which is based on a taboo relationship between brother and sister.

Biography 
Tabitha Suzuma was born in London in 1975 to an English mother and a Japanese father, the eldest of five children. She went to the French Lycée, but stopped attending school at age fourteen. Ten years later, she became a teacher and wrote her first novel, A Note of Madness. She has since written five more novels for young adults. Her fifth novel, Forbidden, is an incestuous love story between a brother and sister. Her most recent novel was published in 2013.

Bibliography

Young Adult novels 

A Note of Madness (Random House, 2006)
From Where I Stand (Random House, 2007)
A Voice in the Distance (Random House, 2008)
Without Looking Back (Random House, 2009)
Forbidden (Random House, 2010)
Hurt (Random House, 2013)

Awards 

2007 A Note of Madness shortlisted for the Branford Boase Award 
2008 From Where I Stand winner of the Young Minds Book Award 
2008 From Where I Stand winner of the Stockport Schools Book Award 
2008 From Where I Stand shortlisted for the North Lanarkshire Catalyst Book Award 
2008 From Where I Stand nominated for the Waterstones Children's Book Prize
2008 From Where I Stand nominated for the Carnegie Medal
2008 Without Looking Back nominated for the Waterstones Children's Book Prize
2009 A Voice in the Distance nominated for the UKLA Children's Book Award 
2008 A Voice in the Distance shortlisted for the Lancashire Children's Book of the Year
2009 Without Looking Back shortlisted for the Young Minds Book Award 
2010 Without Looking Back shortlisted for the Stockport Schools Book Award 
2011 Forbidden nominated for the  Carnegie Medal
2011 Proibito/Forbidden winner of the Premio Speciale Cariparma for European Literature 2011 
2015 Hurt nominated for the Carnegie Medal

References

External links 

Official Website
 Author profile at Penguin
The Lost Chord (The Guardian)

1975 births
Living people
English children's writers
English women writers
British writers of young adult literature
Women writers of young adult literature